The following is a list of stadiums in China, indoor and outdoor, ordered by capacity. Currently stadiums with a capacity of 10,000 or more are included.

See also
List of Asian stadiums by capacity
List of stadiums by capacity
List of home stadiums of China national football team

Notes

References

China
 
Stadiums
Stadiums